Kim Min-hai (born on 4 December 1954) is a South Korean footballer who played for SV Darmstadt 98, SV Waldhof Mannheim, Daewoo Royals as a midfielder.

Career
Kim Min-hai joined SV Darmstadt 98 in 1979 and transferred to SV Waldhof Mannheim in June 1981.

In May 1983, he returned to Korea and joined Daewoo Royals with Park Jong-won.

Honours

References

External links
 
 
 Min-Hai Kim bei wikiwaldhof.de

1954 births
Living people
Association football forwards
South Korean footballers
South Korean expatriate footballers
South Korea international footballers
South Korean football managers
SV Darmstadt 98 players
SV Waldhof Mannheim players
2. Bundesliga players
Busan IPark players
K League 1 players
Expatriate footballers in Germany
South Korean expatriate sportspeople in Germany